The Institute of Biological, Environmental and Rural Sciences (IBERS) is a department of Aberystwyth University within its Faculty of Earth and Life Sciences, and is located in Aberystwyth, Ceredigion, Wales. It has a remit for teaching, research and business innovation in the area of bio-sciences, land use and the rural economy.

Sites
IBERS is currently situated on two main sites. The main teaching activity takes place at the Edward Llwyd, IBERS and Cledwyn buildings on the university's Penglais campus and the majority of its research activities take place at the far larger Gogerddan campus, two miles to the North East of Aberystwyth, near Penrhyncoch and Bow Street.

Teaching
Taught undergraduate degree schemes offered by IBERS include those in Agriculture, Biology, Biochemistry, Ecology, Genetics, Marine & Freshwater Biology, Microbiology, Plant Biology, Veterinary Biosciences, Zoology and Equine Science. IBERS offers a range of taught postgraduate courses and, in partnership with Bangor University, offers a distance learning postgraduate programme in Sustainable and Efficient Food Production. The institute has approximately 1300 undergraduate students, approximately 150 postgraduate students, 70 full-time lecturers and a similar number of part-time associate-lecturers.

Research
IBERS has three research themes: Animal and Microbial Science, Environmental Impact and Genome Diversity. The institute has a state of the art translational genomics facility and is home to the BBSRC National Phenomics Centre.

Plant Breeding
IBERS has active breeding programmes for forage and amenity grasses, forage legumes, grain legumes, oats and miscanthus.

History
IBERS' history is one of a complicated series of mergers.

University College of Wales (UCW)
The University College of Wales (UCW) opened in 1872 with classes in biological sciences starting in 1874. Its department of Agriculture opened in 1891.

Welsh Plant Breeding Station (WPBS)
The Welsh Plant Breeding Station was established in 1919 under the guidance of Sir George Stapledon. This was possible due to an initial donation of £10,000 from Sir Laurence Philipps, 1st Bt., with a further £1,000 for the following ten years. The WPBS was initially based at Alexandra Road in Aberystwyth as a department of UCW, with land at Penglais Farm and Frongoch Farm.
The station moved to new premises on Penglais hill in 1939, since renamed Aberystwyth University's Cledwyn building and housing various service departments of the university. The institute was subsequently moved to Plas Gogerddan, near Bow Street, in 1955 when it was officially opened by the Queen.

Grassland Research Institute (GRI)
The Grassland Improvement Station was established at Drayton, near Stratford upon Avon, Warwickshire, England. In 1949 it moved to a new site at Hurley, Berkshire and was renamed the Grassland Research Institute (GRI). GRI acquired the North Wyke site in Devon in 1981.

Welsh Agricultural College (WAC)

In 1970, the Welsh Agricultural College (WAC) was founded in Llanbadarn Fawr, near Aberystwyth. WAC merged with the Agriculture department of UCW in 1995 to form its Institute of Rural Sciences.

Animal and Grassland Research Institute (AGRI)
In 1985, GRI and the National Institute for Research in Dairying were merged to form the Animal and Grassland Research Institute (AGRI).

Institute of Grassland and Animal Production (IGAP)
WPBS ceased to be part of UCW in 1987 as part of restructuring of the Agricultural and Food Research Council funded research. The WPBS facilities at Gogerddan and Bronydd Mawr and the AGRI sites at Hurley and North Wyke were combined with parts of the Poultry Research Centre at Roslin to form the Institute of Grassland and Animal Production (IGAP).

Institute of Grassland and Environmental Research (IGER)
Further restructuring took place three years later with cessation of pig research and the transfer of the poultry department to the Institute for Animal Physiology and Genetics Research at Roslin. The remaining part was Institute of Grassland and Environmental Research (IGER) retained the facilities at Gogerddan, North Wyke and Bronydd Mawr as well as the Hurley site which closed in 1992. At the same time farm facilities at Trawsgoed were acquired.

Institute of Biological, Environmental and Rural Sciences (IBERS)
In April 2008, IGER merged with Aberystwyth University's Institute of Biological Sciences and its Institute of Rural Sciences to form the Institute of Biological, Environmental and Rural Sciences, one of the largest departments for the life-sciences in the UK.

Directors of the institute

Welsh Plant Breeding Station
 Sir George Stapledon 1919–1942
 T.J. Jenkin 1942–1950
 E.T. Jones 1950–1958
 P.T. Thomas 1958–1974
 J.P. Cooper 1975–1983
 R.Q. Cannell 1984–1987
 J.L. Stoddart 1987

Institute for Grassland and Animal Production
 J. Prescott 1987–1988
 J.L. Stoddart 1988–1990

Institute of Grassland and Environmental Research
 J.L. Stoddart 1990–1993
 Chris Pollock 1993–2007
 Mervyn Humphries 2007–2008

Institute of Biological, Environmental and Rural Sciences
 Wayne Powell 2008–2014
 Mike Gooding 2014–2019
 Iain Donnison 2019-

References

External links
IBERS home page
Bronydd Mawr
BBSRC institutes and centres

Aberystwyth University
Agricultural organisations based in Wales
Organisations based in Aberystwyth
Plant breeding
Agricultural research institutes in the United Kingdom